TrSS St Petersburg was a passenger vessel built for the Great Eastern Railway in 1910.

History

St Petersburg was built by John Brown & Company of Clydebank for the Great Eastern Railway and launched on 25 April 1910. She was launched by Miss Green, daughter of Frederick Green, director of the Great Eastern Railway Company. She was placed on the Harwich-to-Hook of Holland route.

St Petersburg was requisitioned by the Admiralty during the First World War and renamed Archangel in 1916. She was used as a cross-channel troopship.

After the war Archangel returned to railway ownership, and in 1923 she fell under the ownership of the London and North Eastern Railway. She ran aground at the Hook of Holland in South Holland, the Netherlands, on 20 January 1925. Her passengers were landed by three tugs.

References

1910 ships
Steamships of the United Kingdom
Ships built on the River Clyde
Ships of the Great Eastern Railway
Maritime incidents in 1925
Maritime incidents in May 1941
Shipwrecks of England